Markus Karlsson (born 13 December 1979) in Degerfors is a retired Swedish football player.

He left his home town club Degerfors IF in 2003 when he signed for FC Café Opera. After two years there, he was picked up by AIK. Markus Karlsson played a full back or midfielder, preferably on the left wing. After the 2006 season, he was released as a free transfer by AIK, as his contract was not extended. He returned to Deferfors where he ended his career in 2008.

External links
  
 
 Markus Karlsson at EliteFootball.com

1979 births
Living people
AIK Fotboll players
Swedish footballers
AFC Eskilstuna players
Ettan Fotboll players
Division 2 (Swedish football) players
Association football midfielders
Association football defenders